Waukon High School is a public high school located in the city of Waukon, Iowa. It is the only high school in the Allamakee Community School District and serves many of the surrounding towns, including: Harpers Ferry, Waterville, and Dorchester.

2007 Renovation
In 2007, a brand new $16 million addition was built onto the Senior High building.

Previously Jr. High students attended a building separate from the Senior High. 
Both Jr. High and Senior High students will now use the new addition to the school.

Waukon Wellness Center was also built and opened across the street from the school, Matt Hoover, season two winner of NBC's The Biggest Loser, spoke at the grand opening.

Athletics
The athletic teams of Waukon High School are known as the  Indians. WHS is part of the Northeast Iowa Conference. The name "Indians" is named in honor of Waukon Decorah, a chief of what is now known as the Ho-Chunk nation (formerly the Winnebago tribe).

The Indians compete in the Northeast Iowa Conference Conference in the following sports:

Cross Country
 Boys' 7-time Class 2A State Champions (1993, 1995, 1996, 1997, 1998, 1999, 2002)
 Girls' 1993 Class 2A State Champions
Volleyball 
Football 
Basketball 
Bowling
Wrestling
Track and Field 
Golf 
Baseball 
Softball

Notable alumni

Mark Farley: University of Northern Iowa head football coach.
Edward P. Ney, physicist and physics professor at the University of Minnesota

See also
List of high schools in Iowa

References

External links
Waukon High School Website
Waukon High School Tribe-une Newsletter
Northeast Iowa Conference

Iowa High School Athletic Association
Public high schools in Iowa
Schools in Allamakee County, Iowa